Taoism is a East Asian religion founded in ancient China with many schools or denominations, of which none occupies a position of orthodoxy and co-existed peacefully. Taoist branches usually build their identity around a set of scriptures, that are manuals of ritual practices. Scriptures are considered "breathwork", that is "configurations of energy" (qi), embodiments of "celestial patterns" (tianwen), or "revelations of structures" (li).

The earliest Taoist schools emerged during the late Eastern Han dynasty (25-220 CE). They blossomed especially in the region of Shu, modern-day Sichuan. From the 12th and 13th centuries onwards several smaller branches merged into larger ones, but in turn, side-schools developed around the large traditions. In modern times the existing schools tend to be classified under few overarching headings, in most cases under two main denominations: Quanzhen Taoism and Zhengyi Taoism.

Chronology of major schools
Eastern Han period (25–220) to Tang period (618-907): development of the Taiping, Celestial Masters and Zhengyi schools.

Wudoumi Taoism (五斗米道 Wǔdǒumǐ dào, "Way of the Five Pecks of Rice")
Tianshi Taoism (天师道 Tiānshī dào, "Way of the Celestial Masters")
Zhengyi Taoism (正一道 Zhèngyī dào, "Way of the Right Oneness")
Taiping Taoism (太平道 Tàipíng dào, "Way of the Great Peace")

Eastern Jin period (317–420) and Southern dynasties period (420-589): development of the Shangqing and Lingbao branches.

Shangqing Taoism (上清派 Shàngqīng pài, "School of the Highest Clarity")
Maoshan Taoism (茅山宗 Máoshān zōng, "Maoshan Lineage" or "Maoshan Church")
Lingbao Taoism (靈寳派 Língbǎo pài, "School of the Numinous Treasure")
Louguan Taoism (樓觀派 Lóuguān pài or 樓觀道 Lóuguān dào, "School [or Way] of the Contemplation Place")

Jurchen Jin period (1115–1234): development of the Quanzhen branch.

Quanzhen Taoism (全真道 Quánzhēn dào, "Way of the Fulfilled Virtue")
Zhenda Taoism (真大道 Zhēndà dào, "True Wide Way")
Taiyi Taoism (太一道 Tàiyī dào, "Way of the Great Oneness")

Southern Song period (1127–1279): Tianxin, Shenxiao, Qingwei, Donghua and Jingming branches.

Tianxin Taoism (天心派 Tiānxīn pài, "School of the Heavenly Heart")
Shenxiao Taoism (神霄派 Shénxiāo pài, "School of the Divine Empyrean")
Qingwei Taoism (清微派 Qīngwēi pài, "School of the Pristine Simplicity")
Donghua Taoism (東華派 Dōnghuá pài, "School of the Eastern Flower")
Jingming Taoism (淨明道 Jìngmíng dào, "Way of the Pure Light")

16th and 17th centuries: Wuliu.
Wuliu Taoism (伍柳派 Wŭliŭpài, "School of Wu-Liu")

Other schools
Bojia Taoism (帛家道 Bójiā dào)
Lijia Taoism (李家道 Lǐjiā dào, "Way of the Li Family")
Longhu Church or Lineage (龍虎宗 Lónghǔ zōng)
Gezao Church or Lineage (閣皂宗 Gézào zōng)
Jindan Taoism (金丹派 Jīndān pài) or Southern Church (南宗 Nán zōng)
Beidi Taoism (北帝派 Běidì pài)
Laoshan or Lao Huashan Taoism (老華山派 Lǎo huàshān pài)
Jiu Gongshan Taoism (九宮山派 Jiǔ gōngshān pài)
Xuan Taoism (玄教 Xuán jiào)
Longmen Taoism (龍門派 Lóngmén pài)
Namo Taoism (南無派 Námó pài)
Suishan Taoism (隨山派 Suíshān pài)
Yuxian Taoism (遇仙派 Yùxian pài)
Yushan Taoism (嵛山派 Yúshān pài)
Qingjing Taoism (清靜派 Qīngjìng pài)
Sanfeng Taoism (三豐派 Sānfēng pài)
Wudang Taoism (武當道 Wǔdāng dào) or Wudang Benshan Taoism (武當本山派 Wǔdāng běnshān pài)
Jinshan Taoism (金山派 Jīnshān pài) or Laoshan Taoism (嶗山派 Láoshān pài)
ChunYang Taoism (纯阳派 chunyang pài)

Newest schools:

Dong Taoism or Eastern Taoism (東派 Dōng pài), Neidan Dong Taoism (内丹東派 Nèidān dōng pài)
Xi Taoism or Western Taoism (西派 Xi pài), Neidan Xi Taoism (内丹西派 Nèidān xi pài)

See also
 Faism
 Neidan and Waidan
 Taoism in Hong Kong
 Taoism in Malaysia
 Taoism in Singapore
 Taoism in Korea
 Taoism in Vietnam
 Yao Taoism
 Three teachings
 Chinese folk religion 
 Chinese folk religion in Southeast Asia

References

Sources
Poul Andersen, Florian C. Reiter. Scriptures, Schools and Forms of Practice in Daoism: A Berlin Symposium. Harrassowitz Verlag, 2005. 
Qing Xitai (1994) 卿希泰. Zhongguo daojiao 中國道教, vol. 1, pp. 77–83. Shanghai: Zhishi chubanshe. Online.

 
Schools